G6011 Nanchang-Shaoguan Expressway is an expressway that is linked between the Beijing-Hong Kong and Macau Expressway and Daqing–Guangzhou Expressway as well as East China into Guangdong and Pearl River Delta. One of the most convenient corridors, and it is also the second highway connecting Guangdong with Jiangxi after Yuegan Expressway.

References

Chinese national-level expressways
Expressways in Guangdong
Expressways in Jiangxi